The 1908 Delaware gubernatorial election was held on November 3, 1908. Though some Republicans had interest in nominating incumbent Governor Preston Lea to a second term, the state convention instead named former State Senator Simeon S. Pennewill as the Republican nominee. In the general election, Pennewill faced Democratic nominee Rowland G. Paynter, a physician. Pennewill ultimately defeated Paynter by a relatively slim margin, continuing the Republican streak in Delaware gubernatorial elections.

General election

References

Bibliography
 Delaware Senate Journal, 92nd General Assembly, 1st Reg. Sess. (1909).

1908
Delaware
Gubernatorial
November 1908 events